The United States Virgin Islands has competed at the IAAF World Athletics Championships on fifteen occasions, skipping the 2001 edition. It also competed at the 1976 World Championships in Athletics. Its competing country code is ISV. The country has not won any medals at the competition. As of 2017 the country's athletes have reached a final of an event on two occasions. Its best performance is fourth place, by Tabarie Henry in the 2009 men's 400 metres final.

References 

 
Unites States Virgin